Pleasant Run (French: Run Carino) is an oil on canvas painting by an American Impressionist painter T. C. Steele, the leader of the Hoosier Group, and known for his Indiana landscapes. It was completed in 1885 and is painted in an Impressionistic style. The dimensions of the painting are 45.72 by 66.04 centimeters. It is housed at the Indianapolis Museum of Art, Indianapolis, Indiana.

Pleasant Run was painted soon after the artist returned from five years of study in Munich, Germany. It portrays an area which at the time defined the eastern and southern limits of Indianapolis.

References 

1885 paintings